Mark Dorian O'Neill (born 5 March 1959) is a former Australian cricketer who played first-class cricket from 1979 to 1991. He is the son of the former Test cricketer Norm O'Neill and athlete Gwen Wallace.

A right-handed batsman and right-arm medium-fast bowler, O'Neill showed such promise in his youth that at 18 he became the youngest-ever Lancashire League professional, playing two seasons for Bacup in 1977 and 1978. He made his debut for Western Australia in the 1979-80 season aged 20. After three seasons, he moved to New South Wales where he remained for the rest of his career. In 1980 he worked for the MCC at Lord's. O'Neill's highest first-class score was 178 not out for New South Wales against South Australia in 1985-86.

After his retirement from playing, O'Neill became a batting coach and worked with New Zealand, New South Wales and Western Australia. He was recruited by Middlesex as their first specialist batting coach for the 2010 season before returning to Australia on a permanent basis after three years.

See also
 List of New South Wales representative cricketers
 List of Western Australia first-class cricketers

References

External links
 
 CricketArchive profile
 Mark O'Neill appointed as New Zealand's batting coach 24 July 2007
 New Zealand coaching staff strengthened 25 July 2007
 Mark O'Neill joins Middlesex 27 November 2009
 Mark O'Neill returns to Australia 19 December 2012

1959 births
Living people
Australian cricket coaches
Australian cricketers
New South Wales cricketers
Western Australia cricketers
Cricketers from Sydney